Esteban Óscar Figún (born 1 November 1979) is an Argentine former footballer who played as a midfielder.

Figún made 57 appearances in the Primera B Nacional for Tigre and Ferro Carril Oeste, and then "fulfilled his dream" by signing for Primera División club Estudiantes in 2001. He never featured for their first team, and went abroad to play for Maracaibo of Venezuela and for Chilean clubs Provincial Osorno and Deportes Temuco before returning to spend the remainder of his career in the lower divisions of Argentine football.

References

1979 births
Living people
People from San Martín, Buenos Aires
Argentine footballers
Association football midfielders
Club Atlético Tigre footballers
Ferro Carril Oeste footballers
Estudiantes de La Plata footballers
UA Maracaibo players
Provincial Osorno footballers
Deportes Temuco footballers
Club Atlético Acassuso footballers
Defensores Unidos footballers
Argentine expatriate footballers
Expatriate footballers in Chile
Expatriate footballers in Venezuela
Sportspeople from Buenos Aires Province